The 1989 American Soccer League was the second season of the third American Soccer League.

League standings

Northern Division

Southern Division

Playoffs

Bracket

Semifinal 1

Fort Lauderdale advances two games to none.

Semifinal 2

Boston advances two games to none.

ASL Championship Final

Game 1

Game 2

Mini-game

Points leaders

1989 ASL All-Star game
The ASL All-Star game was hosted by the Washington Diplomats at RFK Stadium. Players that were unable to play due to injury, as well as any Dips selected to the squad were replaced, since the All-Stars' opponent was the Dips.

All-Star selections

Match summary

 All-Star game MVP: Osvaldo Ardiles

Post-season honors

All A-League Team
Goalkeeper: Neil Cowley, Winston DuBose
Defenders: Dehinde Akinlotan, Ricardo Alonso, Eric Hawkes, Ronald Simmons, Steve Trittschuh
Midfielders: Osvaldo Ardiles, John Harkes, Willington Ortiz, Tab Ramos, Paul Riley
Forwards: Chico Borja, Michael Brady, John Kerr, Jr., Steve Kinsey, Steve Wegerle

1989 National Professional Soccer Championship
In anticipation of a proposed merger (which took place the following year) the ASL champions faced off against the Western Soccer League champions in the 1989 National Pro Soccer Championship on September 9 in San Jose, California's Spartan Stadium. This would be the first time since 1984 that an undisputed national champion of professional soccer was crowned in the United States.

Match report

See also 
 American Soccer League
 1988 American Soccer League
 1990 American Professional Soccer League

References

External links
 AMERICAN SOCCER LEAGUE III (RSSSF)
 The Year in American Soccer – 1989
 1989 American Soccer League

	

1
American Soccer League (1988–89) seasons
Soccer in Florida